Yaran Di Toli is the debut studio album of model and actor Rizwan Ali Jaffri. It was released in 2013 by Fire Records and produced by MAFFH Productions. Album went on to receive Lux Style Award for Best Music Album of the Year at 13th Lux Style Awards.

Track listing

The lyrics to the songs on the album were written by Mansoor Qaiser, Khadim Hussain Khadam, Raheel Fayyaz, Ali Shakeel, Rizwan Ali and the composition of the album was done by Raheel Fayaz, Khadam Hussain, Khadam, Suhail Abbas.

 "Tuteya Wada" - 3:30 m
 "Suna Mukhra" - 4:01 m
 "Zulfaan Ne Kaliyaan" - 3:47 m
 "Kirchi kirchi" - 5:08 m
 "Medely - Tribute to Noor Jehan" - 4:16 m
 "Rung Rung" - 3:24 m
 "Makhna Di Makhni" - 3:50 m 
 "Gulabo" - 3:34 m
 "Yaran Di Toli" - 4:24 m
 "Yaar Mahi" - 3:29

See also
 13th Lux Style Awards

Reference list

External links
 Official website 
 Yaran Di Toli on SoundCloud

2013 albums
Rizwan Ali Jaffri albums